Ivan van Rooyen (born 1981/82) is a South African professional rugby union football coach. He was short-term head coach of the Lions team that played in the Super Rugby competition. He is also the coach of the Golden Lions team that competes in the Currie Cup. Later he was made permanent head coach of Lions, he remains head coach as of 2022. The Lions now compete in the United Rugby Championship.

Contract Rumours 
Rumours circulated in February 2023 that van Rooyen's contract was up for renewal. Despite achieving a win rate of less than 40%, his contract was expected to be "more lucrative than John Dobson", who won the United Rugby Championship in the 2021/22 season with the DHL Stormers. In the same season the Emirates Lions failed to make the playoffs, finishing 12th out of the 16 team competition.

Career Statistics

Head Coach

Honours

As a Head Coach

Lions 
Currie Cup Premier Division Runner-Up 2019

References

Living people
South African rugby union coaches
Golden Lions coaches
1982 births